The Tyrone Senior Football Championship (known for sponsorship reasons as the LCC Group Tyrone Senior Football Championship) is an annual Gaelic football competition contested by top-tier Tyrone GAA clubs. The Tyrone County Board of the Gaelic Athletic Association has organised it since 1904.

In 2022, the Irish Independent said of the Tyrone SFC: "Tyrone can rightly lay claim to the most competitive senior football championship of them all just by the range of different winners it has produced over the last decade".

Errigal Ciarán are the title holders (2022) defeating Carrickmore in the Final.

History

To date, 24 different clubs have won the Tyrone Senior Football Championship, though some of these no longer exist (including Washingbay Shamrocks, Cookstown Brian Óg, Fintona Davitts and Strabane Faugh-a-Bealach).

The first tournament took place in the 1904–5 season and Coalisland Na Fianna won that by defeating Strabane Lamh Dearg in the final.

No competition was held in the 1906–7, 1909–13, 1914–16, 1918–19, 1920–23 seasons, nor in 1932. The 1939 competition was left unfinished.

Carrickmore is the club that has won the competition the most times (15), the most recent in 2005. Dungannon is the club with the second highest number of wins (11), while Coalisland Na Fianna is the club with the third highest number of wins (10).

Format

The 16 clubs in Division 1 of the All-County Football League in Tyrone compete on a straight knockout basis. Between 1999 and 2007, the competition was played for between 24 clubs.

Honours

The trophy presented to the winners is the O'Neill Cup.

The winners qualify to represent their county in the Ulster Senior Club Football Championship. Tyrone winners do not often fare well in Ulster with Errigal Ciarán the only club from Tyrone to win the Ulster club championship which happened twice in 1993 and 2002. The winners can, in turn, go on to play in the All-Ireland Senior Club Football Championship.

List of finals
(r) = replay  (aet) = after extra time

Notes
† 2020: Dungannon won 8–7 on penalties, after extra time.

Wins listed by club

References

External links
 Official Tyrone GAA Website
 Tyrone at CLUBGAA
Tyrone Club Titles
 Tyrone Intermediate Football Championship
 Tyrone Junior Football Championship

 
1
Senior Gaelic football county championships